Vladlena Priestman (born 19 September 1967) is a British archer. She competed in the women's individual event at the 2000 Summer Olympics.

References

1967 births
Living people
British female archers
Olympic archers of Great Britain
Archers at the 2000 Summer Olympics
Sportspeople from Sumy